Desulfurobacterium thermolithotrophum is a species of autotrophic, sulphur-reducing bacterium isolated from a deep-sea hydrothermal vent. It is the type species of its genus, being thermophilic, anaerobic, Gram-negative, motile and rod-shaped, with type strain BSAT (= DSM 11699T).

References

Further reading

Kadish, Karl M., Kevin M. Smith, and Roger Guilard. "Handbook of porphyrin science." World Scientific: Singapore 2012 (2010): 1-25.

External links

LPSN
Type strain of Desulfurobacterium thermolithotrophum at BacDive -  the Bacterial Diversity Metadatabase

Aquificota
Bacteria described in 1998
Thermophiles